Neoplasene is an herbal veterinary medicine derived from certain chemicals, such as sanguinarine, extracted from the perennial herb Sanguinaria canadensis (the bloodroot plant). It is used to treat cancer in pet animals, especially dogs.  Its effectiveness is unproven and there are serious adverse effects.

References

External links
Neoplasene: A New Weapon in the War Against Cancer
Cancer Treatment for Pets – A Holistic Approach for Dogs and Cats
Neoplasene As A Treatment For Cancer In Dogs

Veterinary drugs